US-Ireland Alliance is a non-profit, proactive and neutral organization which is focused on strengthening the existing relationship between the United States and the Republic of Ireland. The main aim is to build up the future relationship between the two countries. The organization is currently working on several domains such as politics, education, international business, and the general arts. Through these activities and movements, the US-Ireland Alliance is seeking mutual benefits for both countries.

Basic information
The Alliance was founded by Trina Vargo in 1998. According to her, the relationship between the United States and the island of Ireland was in a dramatic and unstable condition. At the end of the last century, Ireland gradually developed into a modern, confident and developed European country. The original purpose of creating this organisation was to take advantage of this dynamic  period. The organization was based in several different cities such as, Washington, D.C., Dublin, Ireland. Moreover, the organisation included members from both the United States, Ireland, the UK and others. The purposes of the organisation is to educate the American public about contemporary Ireland and to help overcome prejudice about it. It is hoped that this alliance will help create a robust and vibrant historical bond into the future. The members of the organisation which include the public, artists, officials, educators and the business communities in both countries are kept well informed on issues of mutual interest. This is achieved through a series of activities and transnational projects in different areas including media, education, culture, and business. The US-Ireland Alliance engages in developing the existed potential boundaries between these two countries and hopes to create new opportunities in the future.

The Founder
Trina Y. Vargo is the founder and the current president of the US-Ireland Alliance, she created the organisation in 1998. In that capacity, she created the George J. Mitchell Scholarship Program recognized as one of the most prestigious scholarships for study abroad for young Americans to explore the contemporary island of Ireland. In the areas of general arts and culture, she also helps the Alliance hold an annual event in Hollywood. There, the Oscar Wilde Award is awarded in order to honour Irish contributors in film and entertainment industries.

Her career was focused on the political sphere before she established the US-Ireland Alliance. From 1987 until May 1998, Vargo served as a foreign policy adviser to Senator Edward M. Kennedy (D-MA) in Washington, D.C. During her years with him, she worked directly with political leaders in Northern Ireland and the Irish Government under the Clinton administration, serving as a key behind-the-scenes player in the Northern Ireland peace process. She contributed significantly in negotiating a visa for Gerry Adams to visit the United States in 1994. In 1993, Vargo assisted Ambassador Madeleine Albright in preparation for her Senate confirmation hearings for the Cabinet post of United States Ambassador to the United Nations and helped to prepare the U.S. Ambassador to Ireland, Jean Kennedy Smith with her confirmation Senate Hearing in June 1993. She has briefed all subsequent US Ambassadors to Ireland, Democrats and Republicans. In a personal capacity, Vargo became the Irish-issue adviser for the U.S. presidential campaign teams since 1998. Most recently, she served as the Obama campaign's adviser on Irish issues in 2008.

Work aspects

Arts and Culture
The Alliance supports creative inspiration by both American and Irish artists. The US-Ireland Alliance supports and promotes arts and culture events on Irish-related areas and holds a variety of events for those Irish films and theatres that have made a significant contribution in the arts industries. The US-Ireland Alliance has held the Oscar Wilde Award in Los Angeles since 2001 to honor those Irish contributors in the American entertainment industries. They also organise various culture-related events throughout the year and make connections and interview prominent Irish artists for podcast programmes online.

Business
With globalisation, the corporations in the United States and Ireland have become closer than ever before. The Alliance helps to promote and develop Irish business on an international scale. Moreover, it contributed to developing and enlarging the scale of U.S. corporations in Ireland. They work with business plans and projects in both countries.

Politics
After the end of the violent conflicts in Northern Ireland the number of Irish immigrants to the US declined dramatically. The financial situation in Ireland  experienced some difficulties at a certain level. Under this circumstance, the US-Ireland Alliance aims at alternating the current relationship between Ireland and the United States to fit the reality. Moreover, the goal of this modern relationship is combined with various spheres including education, culture, general arts, and business. Also, there is a responsibility for both Irish and non-Irish Americans to put efforts in this new historical relationship.

Oscar Wilde Award

Description
The Oscar Wilde Award is the award for cinematic contribution by Irish-Americans in the entertainment industries within the US. This award has beed awarded by the US-Ireland Alliance since 2006 before the Oscar season. The event is usually held at the beginning of the year and has a variety of celebrities in attendance. The nominees are usually Irish talents who have had an impact on the entertainment industries in the areas of music and performance. In the early years it was held at the Ebell on Wilshire Boulevard. Some Irish celebrities have become regular supporters and share their stories and experiences with others. One of the activists of this non-profit organisation, director J. J. Abrams has provided the opportunity to holding this event at Bad Robot in Santa Monica since 2012.

The Major Sponsors
Bad Robot is an American film and television production company founded by one of the activists of the US-Ireland Alliance, J.J. Abrams. The company is currently based in Santa Monica, California.
Accenture is a worldwide management consulting company.

Contributors in 2018

Contributors in 2017

Nominees
2016

2017

2018

Criticism
Over the last decade and a bit, the Oscar Wilde Awards have established themselves as a key event in the last days of (the pun is surely intended) Oscar season. Tucked a mile or so from the Pacific, at the Santa Monica offices of production company Bad Robot, the ceremony, hosted by the US-Ireland Alliance, is less formal than most of LA's more dinner-jacketed bashes, but its scale is, by everyday standards, pretty darn staggering.

George J. Mitchell Scholarship Program
As part of its mission of educating the American public and encouraging the future American leader to pursue a year of education in Ireland and Northern Ireland to strengthen the connection between the United States and Ireland, the US-Ireland Alliance set up George J. Mitchell Scholarship program. In nearly two decades, this program has helped the future leaders to experience the culture of Ireland and provided them a thorough understanding of, and an affinity for the island of Ireland.

Scholarship criteria
According to the official website of George Mitchell Scholars, there are 12 seats annually for the applicant who has to be aged between 18 and 30. This program provides a one-year postgraduate program in any discipline offered by institutions of higher education in both Ireland and Northern Ireland.
Applicants will be censored on the following three criteria
 Scholarship
 Leadership
 a sustained commitment to community and public service.
The Mitchell Scholarship program will cover the fee of tuition, accommodations, a stipend for living expenses and travel cost.

About the program

The organization is open to everyone and especially welcome to those future leaders who have interest in our programs. Since 2001, the first class who received this scholarship showed their ambitious and responsibility of the characteristics of this program.. These characteristics are considered as the core value and hallmarks of Senator Mitchell as well as this scholarship which is named after him.
Those who attended the previous programs will give some advice about the field they choose to work on and pieces of information about the undergraduate institutions or hometown they came from. These volunteers work with potential candidates to help them get to know the island of Ireland. Potential candidates will also benefit from those scholars who have the academic experience in the island of Ireland and learning more about the program directly from them.
The more information about the experience and life of scholars who anticipated in the program are usually highly demanded by the potential candidates. The scholars will also share the fields they study, higher education institutions and the specific life experiences of a university on the island of Ireland. They would also share their personal information and reflections online to help those who are interested in George Mitchell Scholar Program to get familiar with the system.
The official website of George Mitchell Scholars provides information about the programs, including the various field they previously working on, the class note, and blogs to record their life during the year they spent on the island of Ireland as a scholar.

The comments of US-Ireland Alliance

In the website ‘charity Navigator’, US-Ireland Alliance rated 84.98 out of 100 in the overall score and rate, in which the financial permanence received a 90.53 out of 100, and the accountability and transparency received an 81.00 out of 100. Moreover, the US-Ireland Alliance's score is relatively lower than other organization in a similar type of work and same area.

CharityNavigator.org shows FYE 2016 Revenues of $1,085,468 of which $485,000 comes from government grants.  Trina Vargo, President  is paid $248,281 as compensation (23.58% of total expenses). https://www.charitynavigator.org/index.cfm?bay=search.summary&orgid=5497  retrieved 3/10/2019

References

Ireland–United States relations
Organizations established in 1998
Non-profit organizations based in the United States
Irish-American culture